G-44  is a football club based in Qeqertarsuaq, Greenland. They play in the Coca Cola GM.

Achievements 
Coca Cola GM: 2
Champions : 2009, 2011

Football clubs in Greenland
Association football clubs established in 1944
Ilulissat
1944 establishments in Greenland